Persicobacter is a Gram-negative, facultatively anaerobic, chemoorganotrophic, and motile genus from the family of Persicobacteraceae.

References

Further reading 
 

Cytophagia
Bacteria genera